was a noted Japanese sculptor of netsuke from the Kyoto area. He is thus associated with the Kyoto school. His works often depict animals, and he is considered to have been one of the greatest artists working in the netsuke art form.

Biography 
He was mentioned in the Sōken Kishō (装劍奇賞), a compilation published in Osaka in 1781 by Inaba Tsūyrū, in which over 50 netsuke masters are listed. The Sōken Kishō refers to Masanao as skillful and deserving of high praise and recognition. Nevertheless, nothing is now known about his life and career beyond the fact that he was resident of Kyoto.

Masanao's ability to exquisitely capture animal forms in ever varying poses, often imbued with a vitality which evokes the sense of a moment frozen in time, strongly suggests direct observation from nature.

Frederick Meinertzhagen remarks: 

Masanao of Kyoto should not be confused with the series of netsuke-shi from Ujiyamada, Ise Province (modern day Ise) who carved under the same name (albeit with a different variant of the Nao kanji in signatures)

See also 
 Gechū
 Ikkan

References

External links 
 https://collections.lacma.org/node/153811 
 https://research.britishmuseum.org/research/collection_online/search.aspx?people=146074&peoA=146074-2-46
 British Museum : Masanao 正直 (Kyoto) (Biographical details)

Japanese sculptors

18th-century Japanese artists
Netsuke-shi